Alexis Decomberousse, full name Alexis Barbe Benoît Decomberousse, (13 January 1793 – 22 November 1862) was a 19th-century French playwright and vaudevillist.

His plays were presented on the most important Parisian stages of the 19th century such as the Théâtre de l'Ambigu, Théâtre du Palais-Royal, Théâtre des Variétés, Théâtre du Gymnase, Théâtre de la Gaîté, Théâtre de la Porte-Saint-Martin etc.).

Works 

 Le Cocher de fiacre, melodrama in 3 acts, with Benjamin Antier, 1825
 Le Pauvre de l'Hôtel-Dieu, mélodrama in 3 acts, with Antier, 1826
 Le Prisonnier amateur, comedy mingled with couplets, with Armand d'Artois, Ferdinand Laloue and Frédérick Lemaître, 1826
 Le Vieil Artiste, ou la Séduction, melodrama in 3 acts, with Frédérick Lemaître, 1826
 Le Fou, drama in 3 acts, with Antony Béraud and Gustave Drouineau, 1829
 La Maîtresse, comédie-vaudeville in 2 acts, with Hippolyte Le Roux and Merville, 1829
 Le Fils de Louison, melodrama in 3 acts, with Antier, 1830
 L'incendiaire ou la cure et l'archevêché, drama in 3 acts, with Antier, 1831
 Joachim Murat, historical drama in 4 acts and 9 tableaux, with Antier and Théodore Nézel, 1831
 Les Jumeaux de La Réole, ou les Frères Faucher, drama in 3 acts and 7 tableaux, with Michel-Nicolas Balisson de Rougemont, 1831
1832: L'Abolition de la peine de mort, drama in 3 acts and 6 tableaux, with Benjamin Antier and J.-S. Raffard-Brienne
 Une bonne fortune, comédie vaudeville in 1 act, with Jean-François-Alfred Bayard, 1832
 La Fille du soldat, comédie-vaudeville in 2 acts, with Ancelot, 1832
 La Nuit d'avant, vaudeville in 2 acts, with Ancelot, 1832
 Le Serrurier, comedy in 1 act, mingled with vaudevilles, with Bayard, 1832
 Aimer et mourir, 1833
 Madame d'Egmont ou Sont-elles deux ?, comedy in 3 acts, with Ancelot, 1833
 L'Aspirant de marine, opéra-comique in 2 acts, with Edmond Rochefort, 1833
 La consigne, comédie-vaudeville in 1 act, with Ancelot, 1833
 Louis XI en goguettes, vaudeville in 1 act, with F. de Bury, 1833
 La Salle de bains, vaudeville in 2 acts, with Antier, 1833
 Les Suites d'une séparation, comédie-vaudeville in 1 act, with Paul Duport, 1833
 Fretillon ou La bonne fille, vaudeville in 5 acts, with Bayard, 1834
 Salvoisy ou L'amoureux de la Reine, with Michel-Nicolas Balisson de Rougemont and Eugène Scribe, 1834
 Le Capitaine de vaisseau ou La salamandre ; preceded by La carotte d'or, prologue, vaudeville nautique in 2 acts, with Benjamin Antier and Mélesville, 1834
 L'Ami Grandet, comedy in 3 acts, mingled with couplets, with Jacques-François Ancelot, 1834
 Le Dernier de la famille, comédie-vaudeville in 1 act, with Ancelot, 1834
 Le Domino rose, comédie-vaudeville-anecdote in 2 acts, with Ancelot, 1834
 Un secret de famille, drama in 4 acts, with Ancelot, 1834
 Les Tours de Notre-Dame, anecdote du temps de Charles VII, with Antier, 1834
 Le Père Goriot, drama-vaudeville in 3 acts, with Ernest Jaime and Emmanuel Théaulon, 1835
 L'Autorité dans l'embarras, comédie-vaudeville in 1 act, with Ernest Jaime, 1835
 La Fille mal élevée, comédie-vaudeville in 2 acts, with Jean-Baptiste-Rose-Bonaventure Violet d'Épagny, 1835
 Le Violon de l'opéra, comédie-vaudeville in 1 act, with Augustin-Théodore de Lauzanne de Vauroussel, 1835
 Les Deux Nourrices, vaudeville in 1 act, with Bayard, 1835
 Le Tapissier, comedy in 3 acts, mingled with songs, with Ancelot, 1835
 Avis aux coquettes, ou L'amant singulier, comédie-vaudeville in 2 acts, with Eugène Scribe, 1836
 Le Colleur, comédie-vaudeville in 1 act, with B. Antier, 1836
 La Liste des notables, comedy in 2 acts, mingled with couplets, with Charles Dupeuty, 1836
 La Reine d'un jour, chronique mauresque in 2 acts, with Antier, 1836
 La Comtesse du Tonneau, ou Les deux cousines, 1837
 Vive le galop !, folie-vaudeville in 1 act, with Cogniard brothers and Lubize, 1837
 Vouloir, c'est pouvoir, comedy in 2 acts, mingled with song, with Ancelot, 1837
 Le Serment de collège, comedy in 1 act, mingled with couplets, 1838
 Un frère de quinze ans, comédie-vaudeville in 1 act, with Achille d'Artois, 1838
 Le Tireur de cartes, vaudeville en 1 acte, with Eugène Roche, 1838
 Le marché de Saint-Pierre, melodrama in 5 acts, with Antier, 1839
 Le Cheval de Crequi, comedy in 2 acts and 3 parts, 1839
 Les Maris vengés, comédie-vaudeville in 5 acts, with Étienne Arago and Eugène Roche, 1839
 La Grisette de Bordeaux, vaudeville in 1 act, 1840
 L'Honneur d'une femme, drama in 3 acts, with Antier, 1840
 Une journée chez Mazarin, comedy in 1 act, mingled with couplets, with Fulgence de Bury and Théodore Muret, 1840
 Van Bruck, rentier, comédie-vaudeville in 2 acts, with Narcisse Fournier, 1841
 Les Filets de Saint-Cloud, drama in 5 acts, with B. Antier, 1842
 Touboulic le cruel, vaudeville in 1 act, with Ancelot, 1843
 La Polka en Province, folie-vaudeville in 1 act, with Jules Cordier, 1844
 La Sainte-Cécile, opéra comique in 3 acts, with Ancelot, 1844
 Un mystère, comedy in 2 acts, mingled with couplets, with Ancelot, 1844
 Juanita ou Volte-face, comédie-vaudeville in 2 acts, with Bayard, 1846
 La Carotte d'or, comédie-vaudeville in 1 act, with Benjamin Antier and Mélesville, 1846
 L'Homme qui se cherche, comédie-vaudeville in 1 act, with Eugène Roche, 1846
 Le chapeau gris, ou Les obstacles,  comédie-vaudeville in 1 act, with Édouard Brisebarre, 1847
 La Vapeur d'éther ou sans douleur !, vaudeville in 1 act, with Hippolyte Lefebvre, 1847
 Un amant qui ne veut pas être heureux, vaudeville in 1 act, with Lubize, 1850
 Les Trois Coups de pied, comédie-vaudeville in 2 acts, with Lockroy, 1851
 Théâtre de Alexis de Comberousse, foreword by Jules Janin, 3 vol, 1864

Bibliography 
 Louis Gustave Vapereau, Léon Garnier, Dictionnaire universel des contemporains, 1865, p. 485 (Read on line) 
 Stéphane Vachon, 1850, tombeau d'Honoré de Balzac, 2007, p. 538

19th-century French dramatists and playwrights
Writers from Vienne, Isère
1793 births
1862 deaths